St. Michaels is a chapter of the Navajo Nation and a census-designated place (CDP) in Apache County, Arizona, United States. The Navajo Nation Government Campus is located within the chapter at Window Rock.

The population was 1,443 at the 2010 census.

Geography
St. Michaels is located at  (35.662418, -109.094957) on the eastern boundary of the Defiance Plateau. The community is located on the western side of the Black Creek Valley and Black Creek, a north tributary to the southwest-flowing Rio Puerco.

History
The St. Michaels area is referred to as Ts'ithootso in the Navajo language and translates to "area that extends out in yellow and green." The microclimate was originally referred to by its Spanish translation Ciénega Amarilla (Spanish: "yellow meadow") describing the late summer yellow flowers and grass.  The area was first noted by the U.S. military in 1850 when Lt. James Harvey Simpson named it Sieneguilla de Maria, its Spanish name misheard by a non-native speaker.

In the 1850s a planned ambush against local Navajos was thwarted by a man who went on to become a signatory to the Navajo Treaty of 1868. Delgadito (Chách'oshnééz ((“Tall Syphilis”)) successfully alerted Navajos preparing for a prisoner exchange with Mexican slave-holders.

Saint Michael Convent
Construction on the Franciscan Mission began in 1896 using financing from Rev. Mother Katharine Drexel, founder of the Sisters of the Blessed Sacrament. Rev. Anselm Weber took over construction on October 11, 1897, adopting the name Saint Michaels for the area (from Navajo Tsʼíhootso: "Green Meadow"). St. Michael Parish would be officially founded in 1898.

In 1910, Fr. Berard Haile prepared a Navajo ethnologic dictionary at the Franciscan Mission.

Demographics

As of the census of 2000, there were 1,295 people, 306 households, and 247 families residing in the CDP. The racial makeup of the CDP was 91.1% Native American, 7.0% White, 0.1% Black or African American, 0.8% from other races, and 1.0% from two or more races.  2.2% of the population were Hispanic or Latino of any race.

There were 306 households, out of which 50.3% had children under the age of 18 living with them, 49.0% were married couples living together, 25.8% had a female householder with no husband present, and 19.0% were non-families. 13.1% of all households were made up of individuals, and 3.9% had someone living alone who was 65 years of age or older.  The average household size was 4.0 and the average family size was 4.5.

In the CDP, the age distribution of the population shows 40.8% under the age of 18, 10.7% from 18 to 24, 24.9% from 25 to 44, 17.1% from 45 to 64, and 6.5% who were 65 years of age or older.  The median age was 24 years. For every 100 females, there were 93.9 males.  For every 100 females age 18 and over, there were 87.1 males.

The median income for a household in the CDP was $34,107, and the median income for a family was $28,839. Males had a median income of $41,964 versus $24,531 for females. The per capita income for the CDP was $11,572.  About 20.3% of families and 22.4% of the population were below the poverty line, including 24.3% of those under age 18 and 27.3% of those age 65 or over.

Education
St. Michaels is a part of Window Rock Unified School District, and is served by Window Rock Elementary School, Tse Ho Tso Middle School, and Window Rock High School.

The community is also served by the Saint Michael Indian School, a K–12 private, Catholic school established by Saint Katharine Drexel in 1902. Saint Michael Indian School is a member of the National Catholic Education Association and the Roman Catholic Diocese of Gallup Catholic School System.

A tribal elementary school that contracts with the Bureau of Indian Education (BIE), Hunters Point Boarding School, is nearby and has a St. Michaels postal address.

Health care
St. Michaels is served by the Fort Defiance Indian Hospital at Fort Defiance.

References

Census-designated places in Apache County, Arizona
Populated places on the Navajo Nation